The Interstate 635 Bridge is an automobile crossing of the Kansas River in Kansas City, Kansas.
The bridge was built in 1976, and work to rebuild it started 2003, and finished by 2005. During the rebuild process, the bridge underwent repairs, was resurfaced, and the girder beams were replaced in some places.

Bridges over the Kansas River
Bridges in Kansas City, Kansas
Bridges completed in 1976
Road bridges in Kansas
Interstate 35
1976 establishments in Kansas
Girder bridges in the United States